Mironova is a rural locality (a village) in Stepanovskoye Rural Settlement, Kudymkarsky District, Perm Krai, Russia. The population was 43 as of 2010. There are 3 streets.

Geography 
Mironova is located 8 km south of Kudymkar (the district's administrative centre) by road. Pochkina is the nearest rural locality.

References 

Rural localities in Kudymkarsky District